Jaadugar may refer to:
 Jaadugar (1989 film), an Indian Hindi-language fantasy comedy film
 Jaadugar (2022 film), an Indian Hindi-language sports drama film